Thiruninravur railway station is one of the railway stations on the Chennai Central–Arakkonam section of the Chennai Suburban Railway Network. It serves the neighbourhood of Thiruninravur, a suburb of Chennai, and is located 29 km west of the Chennai Central railway station. It has an elevation of 37 m above sea level.

History
The lines at the station were electrified on 29 November 1979, with the electrification of the Chennai Central–Tiruvallur section.

Existing footbridge was demolished due to less usage and a new footbridge was erected in February 2016. In 2019, reservation counter was moved from the station platform to footbridge.

Layout
The station has three platforms. Platform 1 is meant for long-distance trains, goods trains and trains starting from Thiruninravur. Platform 2 and 3 are meant for local suburban trains. Platform 4 is for fast suburban trains.

Traffic
The station has a footfall of more than 10,000 commuters every day.

See also
 Chennai Suburban Railway
 Railway stations in Chennai

References

Stations of Chennai Suburban Railway
Railway stations in Chennai
Railway stations in Tiruvallur district